Broniszewski (feminine Broniszewska) is a Polish surname. Notable people with the surname include:

 Bartosz Broniszewski (born 1988), Polish-German footballer
 Mieczysław Broniszewski (born 1948), Polish football manager

Polish-language surnames